Cosmosoma beata is a moth of the family Erebidae. It was described by Arthur Gardiner Butler in 1876. It is found in Panama, Colombia and Brazil.

References

beata
Moths described in 1876